Amanda Daniela Coneo Cardona (born  in Cartagena) is a Colombian volleyball player. She is part of the Colombia national team.

Career
She won the silver medal in the 2011 Colombia Junior Championship, representing Bolivar.

2012
Coneo participated in the 2012 Pan-American Cup in the senior category as a warm up for the 2012 Colombian National Games and also part of the Bolivar Ganador development program. Colombia finished the competition in the eleventh place, with just one victory, achieved in the las match against Mexico. She played the 2012 South American Girls championship, ranking in fifth place.

2013
In April, Coneo traveled to Guatemala to play the 2013 Youth Pan-American Cup ending up in seventh place. She won the 2013 Colombian Championship in the senior category with Bolivar. She won the 2013 Bolivarian Games bronze medal with her national team.

2014
Coneo played the 2013-14 Peruvian League with the club Tupac Amaru. She helped the Colombian national team to qualify for the first time to the FIVB World Grand Prix by reaching the 2014 Pan-American Cup seventh place. Later, she won the 2014 U22 South American Championship silver medal and Best Outside Hitter award and later the 2014 Junior South American Championship Best Outside Hitter award and her team finished in fifth place. Coneo won the silver medal in the 2014 U23 Pan-American Cup held in Peru, when they lost the gold medal match 1–3 to the Dominican Republic. She helped her national team to end up in the sixth place in the volleyball tournament held in the 2014 Central American and Caribbean Games in Veracruz, Mexico. With Liga Bolivarense, she won the 2014 Colombian National Championship in the senior and junior category.

2015
During the 2015 Pan-American Cup, Coneo ranked third among the scorers with 124 points, nonetheless, her national team finished in eight place. She played in August the 2015 FIVB U23 World Championship where Colombia ranked tied in ninth place. She participated in the 2015 FIVB World Grand Prix, reaching the Group 3 Final Four and winning the group bronze medal. With Liga Bolivarense she claimed the 2015 National Games championship over the Antioquia team. Coneo was selected to play the 2015 South American Championship winning the bronze medal with her national team.

2016
In January 2016, she joined the Italian club Lardini Filottrano. In May 2016, she played the 2016 Summer Olympics qualifier tournament in Puerto Rico, where her team failed the berth to the 2016 Summer Olympics after ranking second in the tournament. Coneo participated in the 2016 FIVB Volleyball World Grand Prix qualifying to the Final Four, but losing the bronze medal match 2–3 to Peru. With her national U22 team, she won the 2016 U22 South American Championship silver medal. She signed for the Italian club Sab Grima Legnano from the A2 Championship and became the first foreign player playing for them.

2017
Coneo played the 2017 FIVB Volleyball World Grand Prix group 2 and ranked in seventh place and 19th overall. She won the 2017 Colombian Senior Championship as the captain of the Bolivar team, their fifth championship. She played with her national senior team the 2017 South American Championship, winning the silver medal when they lost 0–3 to Brazil. She played in October the 2018 FIVB  World Championship CSV qualification tournament, but her team could not get a berth for next year competition. After an Italian A2 season where she scored 424 points, she re-signed with the Italian club Sab Volley Legnano for the 2017/18 season.

Personal life
As of 2016 she was a Psychology student. Her parents are Gabriel and Rocio and she has two siblings, Zuleima and Gabriela, who also played volleyball with the national team.

Awards

Individuals
 2014 U22 South American Championship "Best Outside Spiker"
 2014 Junior South American Championship "Best Outside Spiker"
 2021 South American Championship – "Best Outside Spiker"

Clubs
 2014 Colombian Championship –  Champion, with Liga Bolivarense
 2017 Colombian Championship –  Champion, with Liga Bolivarense

References

External links
 FIVB Profile

1996 births
Living people
Colombian women's volleyball players
Sportspeople from Cartagena, Colombia
Outside hitters
Expatriate volleyball players in Italy
Colombian expatriate sportspeople in Italy
Colombian expatriate volleyball players
Pan American Games medalists in volleyball
Pan American Games silver medalists for Colombia
Volleyball players at the 2019 Pan American Games
Medalists at the 2019 Pan American Games
21st-century Colombian women